The 16557 / 16558 Rajya Rani Express is a daily commuter train between Mysore and Bangalore. This train leaves Bangalore City at 11:30 AM and reaches Mysore at 1:45 PM. In the return direction, it leaves Mysore at 2:50 PM to reach Bangalore City at 5:20 PM.

It operates with the number 16558 from Bangalore to Mysore and 16557 in the reverse direction. En route, this train stops at Kengeri, Bidadi, Ramanagara, Channapatna, Maddur, Mandya, Pandavapura and Srirangapatna.

It offers second-class chair cars & an air-conditioned chair car available for booking in advance.

History
Rajya Rani Express trains are a series of express trains operated by Indian Railways to connect state capitals with other cities important for tourism, pilgrimage or business. This was introduced in the Rail Budget 2011.

References

Transport in Mysore
Transport in Bangalore
Railway services introduced in 2011
Rail transport in Karnataka
Rajya Rani Express trains